Ramanuja Devanathan (2 April 1959 – 7 January 2017) was a renowned Sanskrit scholar from India. He was the head of the Rashtriya Sanskrit Sansthan at Jammu and the former Vice Chancellor of Jagadguru Ramanandacharya Rajasthan Sanskrit University, under Government of Rajasthan. He was the Registrar of Rashtriya Sanskrit Sansthan, New Delhi.

In 2013, Devanathan was the recipient of Maharana of Mewar Charitable Foundation (MMCF)'s 32nd annual award. He was also the editor of 2007 edition of English-Sanskrit Dictionary, originally written by Sir Monier Monier-Williams.

 

Devanathan died on 7 January 2017, in Mumbai while traveling on work.

Academic career

References

External links
 Biodata at Jagadguru Ramanandacharya Rajasthan Sanskrit University

1959 births
2017 deaths
People from Rajasthan
Sanskrit writers